Brotzeit (Chinese: 博灿) is a chain of casual dining restaurants based in Singapore, with franchised restaurants in 11 markets in the Asia-Pacific region. Brotzeit International was established in Singapore in 2006. The restaurant chain serves Bavarian cuisine and German beer.

Brotzeit International was awarded the Franchisor of the Year 2012 by the Franchising and Licensing Association of Singapore.

Directly-operated outlets 
Brotzeit International has its headquarters based in Singapore and directly operates the restaurants in its home market. Markets outside of Singapore are franchised.

Brotzeit's first outlet opened in 2006 in VivoCity; the second store was opened in 2008 at Raffles City; the third outlet was opened at 313@Somerset in 2010; the fourth outlet at The Star Vista was opened in September 2012, Katong was opened in late September 2013 and Westgate was opened in February 2014.

Franchised markets 
In addition to the directly operated stores in Singapore, there are a total of 14 franchise restaurants throughout Asia. Currently operating outlets include two outlets in Malaysia (Mid-Valley Megamall and Sunway Pyramid, Kuala Lumpur) and one outlet in Kumho-Link, Ho-Chi Minh, Vietnam, and Hong Kong, Beijing, Qingdao, China.

The company expects to be developing in several additional markets in North Asia, including Japan, Korea, Macau, and other markets in China, and Australia/New Zealand in 2013.

Brotzeit International is a member of the FLA (Franchise and Licensing Association) Singapore, and the FCA - Franchise Council of Australia.

Brotzeit is now closed in Ho Chi Minh City, Vietnam

Food 
The chain serves Bavarian cuisine like Schweinshaxe or pork knuckles and Nürnberger sausages. Other menu items include homemade Brezn (pretzels) and Brotzeit's own proprietary sausage recipes for Käsekrainer, Hühnerwurst, Nürnberger, Weißwurst, Knoblauchwurst, Currywurst, and Bockwurst.

Beer 
Beer (or Bier) served at Brotzeit are brewed according to the Reinheitsgebot a.k.a. German Beer Purity Law or Bavarian Purity Law which was passed in 1516. Most of the outlets serve Paulaner, Löwenbräu or Krombacher, imported directly from Germany. In some cases, other brands of Munich-based Biers are also available such as Hofbräu which is available at the outlet in Saigon.

Typically however, most Brotzeit outlets carry a selection of four Paulaner or Löwenbräu draft Biers (Original Münchner Lager, Hefe Weißbier, Dunkel Hefe Weißbier, and Original Münchner Dunkel Lager), along with speciality Bavarian Bottled Biers. They also sell Weihenstephaner Alkoholfrei Original by the bottle.

They also offer a wine selection, consisting of primarily Austrian and German wines.

Celebrations 
Oktoberfest is also celebrated at the restaurants annually.

Other festivals which are celebrated in the Bavaria region are also celebrated here, like Maifest and Easter.

References 

Restaurant chains in Singapore
Singaporean brands